Bidalasana or Marjariasana, both meaning Cat Pose in Sanskrit, is a kneeling asana in modern yoga as exercise. A variant with one leg held up is Vyaghrasana, Tiger Pose; a similar variant with one leg held straight out is Chakravakasana, Sunbird Pose. A variant with the back lowered is Bitilasana, Cow Pose; this is often used as the counter-posture, and a widely used exercise is to alternate between Cat and Cow Poses repeatedly.

Etymology and origins

The name Bidalasana, बिडालासन, is from the Sanskrit बिडाल, biḍāl, meaning "cat", and "āsana" meaning "posture" or "seat". The alternative name Marjariasana (also written Marjaryasana), मार्जरीआसन, is similarly from मार्जरी, mārjārī, also meaning "cat". A similar pose was described in Niels Bukh's early 20th century Danish text Primary Gymnastics as "prone-kneeling position", which in turn was derived from a 19th-century Scandinavian tradition of gymnastics.

A different asana, Marjarottanasana, meaning upside-down cat stretch pose, is illustrated in the 19th century Sritattvanidhi.

A pose named Vyaghrasana or tiger pose is listed but not described in the 17th century Hatha Ratnavali.

Description

The practitioner kneels on all fours and slowly raises and lowers the back, transitioning in a gentle vinyasa between Cat and Cow Poses, and exercising the core muscles that support the spine.

The pose is considered in Sivananda Yoga to be suitable for use during pregnancy.

Variations

In variations of the pose, one leg is stretched out straight, and the knee of the stretched out leg may then be bent so the foot points straight up; the opposite hand may also be stretched out in Vyaghrasana, Tiger Pose The similar Chakravakasana, Sunbird Pose, has the leg and arm stretched out straight, horizontally.

Cat Pose is often alternated with Bitilasana, Cow Pose, where the belly and back are lowered and the hips and shoulders remain unmoved.

References 

Backbend asanas
Core strength asanas